Damen Marcu (born February 18, 1999) is an American soccer player.

Career
Marcu signed with USL club Colorado Springs Switchbacks on July 28, 2017.

References

External links
Colorado Springs Switchbacks bio

1999 births
Living people
American soccer players
Colorado Springs Switchbacks FC players
Association football midfielders
Soccer players from Colorado
USL Championship players